Elachista chrysodesmella is a moth of the family Elachistidae. It is found from Sweden to the Iberian Peninsula, Italy and Romania and from France to Russia and Ukraine.

Adults are on wing from May to June and again from July to August.

The larvae feed on Brachypodium pinnatum, Brachypodium sylvaticum, Carex humilis, Carex montana, Dactylis glomerata, Holcus and Poa trivialis. They mine the leaves of their host plant. The mine starts as a narrow ascending corridor starting at the center of the leaf. Later, the direction reverses and the mine widens. The frass is deposited in the upper part of the mine. Pupation takes place outside of the mine. Larvae can be found from early spring to May and again from July to the beginning of August. They are pale yellow.

References

chrysodesmella
Moths described in 1850
Moths of Europe